Lawrence Kutner may refer to:
 Lawrence Kutner (psychologist), American child and media psychologist
 Lawrence Kutner (House), a fictional character in the TV series House, M.D.